Semyonovka is a rural locality (a selo) in Rodionovsky Selsoviet of Bureysky District, Amur Oblast, Russia. The population was 249 as of 2018. There are 3 streets.

Geography 
Semyonovka is located north-east from R297 highway, 39 km north of Novobureysky (the district's administrative centre) by road. Tryokhrechye is the nearest rural locality.

References 

Rural localities in Bureysky District